Club Deportivo Tudelano is a Spanish football team based in Tudela, in the autonomous community of Navarre. Founded in 1935 it plays in Segunda División RFEF – Group 2, holding home matches at Estadio Ciudad de Tudela, with a capacity of 11,000 seats.

History
In 2016, CD Tudelano qualified to the promotion playoffs to Segunda División for the first time in its history.

Season to season

1 season in Primera División RFEF
15 seasons in Segunda División B
1 season in Segunda División RFEF
55 seasons in Tercera División

Current squad

Famous players
 Jannick Buyla
 Gorka Luariz
 Oussama Souaidy
 Eleuterio Santos
 Enrique Martín

References

External links
Official website 
Futbolme team profile 

 
Football clubs in Navarre
Association football clubs established in 1935
1935 establishments in Spain
Primera Federación clubs